Grubačić is a Serbian surname. Notable people with the surname include:

Andrej Grubačić (born 1976), Serbian historian and activist
Slobodan Grubačić (born 1942), Serbian linguist and writer

Serbian surnames